The Willmar station of Willmar, Minnesota was built in 1948, replacing an 1892 Cass Gilbert designed depot.  It served the Great Northern Railway and its successor Burlington Northern until 1971.  Thereafter, passenger service continued under Amtrak, but with only a single route through Willmar, the Empire Builder.  After the North Coast Hiawatha, which ran on the former Northern Pacific Railway line from Minneapolis to Fargo, ended service in 1979, the Empire Builder moved to that corridor.

References

External links
Willmar, Minnesota – TrainWeb

Former Amtrak stations in Minnesota
Former Great Northern Railway (U.S.) stations
1892 establishments in Minnesota
Railway stations in the United States opened in 1892
Railway stations closed in 1979
Railway stations in the United States opened in 1948
Railway stations closed in 1970